Pay-to-stay can mean:

 In retailing, a slotting fee
 Pay to Stay, a UK government policy concerned with social housing
 Pay-to-stay (imprisonment), the practice of charging prisoners for accommodation in U.S. jails